A Cassette Tape Culture (Phase Three) is a collection by the American industrial band ATelecine released in 2011, of previously unreleased outtakes, demos, and remixes from sessions from the first three out-of-print aTelecine releases aVigillant Carpark EP, ...And Six Dark Hours Pass, and A Cassette Tape Culture (Phase One).

Track listing
 "Ok...So"
 "Yaniuarj" (2004 demo)
 "Carry"
 "Friday Night in a Small Town"
 "Ice Removal and Meditation"
 "Trouble" (2004 demo)
 "Only at Night" (Lament demo)
 "Blue Too" (Lost Draft)
 "Chroeg Xen"
 "Kitchen Light"
 "Semitree (On Six Mix)
 "Sky Then Trees Then Birds Then Nothing" (Stand Mix)
 "Stepfather, Meth Heads" (RX demo)
 "Tenplus" (Early Stardream demo)
 "The Thieves"
 "The Weak Hands" (2006 demo)

References

2011 albums
ATelecine albums